Two submarines of the United States Navy have borne the name USS Unicorn, for the narwhal, an Arctic marine cetacean with a single tusk suggesting the horn of a unicorn.  Both were Tench-class submarines, and neither were commissioned.
  was cancelled before construction began in 1944.
  was laid down less than a year later and launched, but never commissioned.

United States Navy ship names